Jeong Do-sang is a South Korean novelist and children's author. Jeong debuted as a writer in 1987 with the short story "Our Winter." He has written collections such as Chinguneun meolli gatsseodo (친구는 멀리 갔어도 Even though my friend went far), Spring at Silsangsa Temple (실상사), Moransijang yeoja (모란시장 여자 The Woman at the Moran Market), and Brier Rose (찔레꽃). He has also written the novels Faint Hope (누망), Nakta (낙타 The Camel), Eunhaengnamu sonyeon (은행나무 소년 The Ginkgo Tree Boy), as well as the children’s novel Dolgorae pachino (돌고래 파치노 Pachino the Dolphin).

Jeong won the 17th Danjae Literary Award for Faint Hope, the 25th Yosan Literary Prize for Brier Rose, and the 7th Beautiful Writer’s Award.

Life
Jeong Do-sang was born on January 3, 1960 in Macheon-myeon, Hamyang-gun, Gyeongsanngnam-do, South Korea. His father died when he was six. He moved to Seoul in 1971 and pursued studies while he worked various jobs such as a street peddler selling chewing gum, a newspaper boy, and taking on manual labor. He enrolled at the Department of German Language and Literature at Jeonbuk National University in 1981.

Jeong was imprisoned for his role in the Protest Against the Construction of the Peace Dam in 1986. In 1987, while serving his sentence in Jeonju Prison, he decided to begin writing. When he was released from prison, he worked at apartment construction sites while writing.  Jeong won the Chonnam National University’s May Literature Award for his short story Our Winter (우리들의 겨울). Afterwards, he actively pursued his career as a writer.

In 2005, Jeong's fifteen-year-old son committed suicide. His son's suicide gave Jeong Do-sang great shock, and caused a literary change within him. These experiences were presumably deeply related to his later constant interest in the youth problem as well as his publication of young adult novels and children's books.

Writing

As a Realist writer, Jeong lays out themes based on life experiences in his writing. His early works have realistic insights into how the state uses its great authority to destroy the lives of individuals. Particularly, in Chinguneun meolli gatsseodo (친구는 멀리 갔어도 Even though my friend went far), he portrays how a soldier that accidentally kills a superior officer becomes involved in a fabricated defection to North Korea, as well as a reforestation project. Jeong also realistically portrays violence within the military, making it an early representative work that widely spread his name among readers.

In terms of works after the 2000s, Jeong  focused his literary interest on nomadism and the problem of refugees. Brier Rose (찔레꽃), a serialized novel, is about North Korean defectors and their journey, telling the process of escape and settlement. It realistically portrays the issue of division concerning South Korean society.

In the 2010 novel Nakta (낙타 The Camel), Jeong  portrays the inner side of a protagonist. The protagonist faces inner loneliness via a journey through the Gobi Desert with his son, who passed away with only a short note. Nakta (낙타 The Camel) portrays how such scars of the protagonist are healed through friendships made with many people he meets during his travel.

Works in translation
 Spring at the Silsanga Temple (English)

Works in Korean 
Short Story Collections 
 Chinguneun meolli gatsseodo (친구는 멀리 갔어도 Even though my friend went far), Pulbit, 1988.
 Spring at Silsangsa Temple (실상사), Munhak Dongne, 2004.
 Moransijang yeoja (모란시장 여자 The Woman at the Moran Market), Changbi, 2005.
 Brier Rose (찔레꽃), 2008.

Novels 
 Yeolahopui jeolmang kkeut-e bureuneun hanaui sarangnore (열아홉의 절망 끝에 부르는 하나의 사랑노래 A Love Song at the End of My Desperation at Nineteen), Nokdu, 1990.
 Geudaeyeo dasi mannal ttaekkaji (그대여 다시 만날 때까지 Until I Meet You Again), Pulbit, 1991.
 Geurigo naeili itda (그리고 내일이 있다 And Tomorrow Comes), Achim, 1992.
 Nalji anneumyeon gileul ilneunda (날지 않으면 길을 잃는다 If You Don't Fly, You Will Be Lost), Nokdu, 1994.
 Yeolae (열애; Passion), Prunsoop, 1995.
 Jisangui sigan (지상의 시간 Time on Earth), Hantteut, 1997.
 Pureun bang (푸른 방 The Blue Room), Hanwul, 2000. 
 Geu yeoja jeonhyerin(그 여자 전혜린 That Woman Jeon Hyerin), Duri Media, 2002.
 Faint Hope (누망), Silcheon Munhaksa, 2003. 
 Nakta (낙타 The Camel), Munhakdongne, 2010

Children's Novels
 Jirisan pyeonji (지리산 편지 Letter from Jirisan), Mirae M&B, 2001.
 Dolgorae pachino (돌고래 파치노 Pachino the Dolphin), Munhakdongneeorini, 2006.
 Jongihak (종이학 The Paper Crane), Naeinsaenguichaek, 2007.
 Appaui bimil (아빠의 비밀 Father's Secret), Naeinsaenguichaek, 2008. 
 Bulgeun yuchaekkot (붉은 유채꽃 Red Rape Flowers), Pureunnamoo, 2009. 
 Eunhaengnamu sonyeon (은행나무 소년 The Ginkgo Tree Boy), Changbi, 2012. 
 Maeumoreulkkot (마음오를꽃 A Flower On My Mind), Jaeumgwamoeum, 2014.

Awards
 2003 17th Danjae Literary Award
 2008 25th Yosan Literary Prize 
 2008 7th  Beautiful Writer's Award

Further reading 
 정은경, 키치에 맞서는 비정성시-정도상의 찔레꽃, 지도의 암실, 소명출판, 2010. 
 Jeong Eungyeong, “Kichi-e matseoneun bijeongseongsi – Jeong Do-sang’s Brier Rose”, Jido-ui Amsil, Somyeongchulpan, 2010. 
 고명철, 속악한 세계를 위반하는 ‘누망’-정도상의 누망, 칼날 위에 서다, 실천문학사, 2005.
 Go Myeongcheol, “’Numang’, a book that violates the vulgar world – Jeong Do-sang's Numang", Kalnal wi-e seoda, Silcheonmunhaksa, 2005.
 오창은, 불의 시대를 거쳐 희망의 서사로, 비평의 모험, 실천문학사, 2005.
 Oh Changeun, “Past the Age of Fire and to the Epic of Hope”, Bipyeongui Moheom, Silcheonmunhaksa, 2005.
 정은경, 법의 정당성 위에 삶의 정당성을 재정위하라: 정도상 장편 은행나무 소년, 창작과비평, 2012년 겨울호.
 Jeong Eungyeong, “Placing Legitimacy for Life over Legitimacy for Law: Jeong Do-sang’s novel Eunhaengnamu sonyeon”, The Quarterly Changbi, Winter 2012. 
 이경재, 찔레꽃을 피우기 위해 필요한 것들-정도상, 찔레꽃, 실천문학, 2008년 겨울. 
 Lee Gyeongjae, “Things Needed to Grow Brier Rose – Jeong Do-sang, Brier Rose”, Literature and Practice, Winter 2008. 
 구중서, 진실과 전형의 문제, 창작과비평, 1990년 겨울.
 Gu Jungseo, “A Problem of Truth and Model”, The Quarterly Changbi, Winter 1990.
 구중서, 불행과 패기의 역사, 창작과비평, 1989년 봄.
 Gu Jungseo, “A History of Misfortunes and Ambition”, The Quarterly Changbi, Spring 1989.

References 

1960 births
Korean writers
Living people
Jeonbuk National University alumni